The New Delhi district is an administrative district of Delhi in India. Its district headquarters is New Delhi. It is named after New Delhi, the capital of India, located within its borders, and is in its entirety a part of the Delhi megacity. The district was founded in 1997, but its borders significantly changed during the redrawing of the Delhi districts in 2012.

Geography 
The New Delhi district spans over all three municipalities of the National Capital Territory (NCT) of Delhi, namely New Delhi, the Delhi Cantonment and parts of the Municipal Corporation of Delhi area. It covers the centrally located Lutyens' Delhi and reaches all the way to the NCT's southwestern borders to Gurugram. As the other 10 districts of the NCT, it is subdivided into three tehsils: Chanakyapuri, Delhi Cantonment and Vasant Vihar.

History 

The New Delhi district was founded in 1997, when the former single district of the NCT was split into 9 districts. In its then borders, the district covered 35 km².

When the borders of the districts of Delhi were redrawn in 2012, the New Delhi district became significantly bigger, now spanning all the way to the border to the neighboring state of Haryana.

References

External links

 
Districts of Delhi
New Delhi